Australopristis is an extinct genus of sawfish from the late Cretaceous epoch. Its name is derived from the Latin for "southern" and the Greek for "saw". It is known from a single species, A. wiffeni named for the late prominent fossil hunter Joan Wiffen. This species is currently known only from rostral teeth found at Mangahouanga stream and East Wing, Haumuri bluff, New Zealand. It's rostral teeth possess a smooth root which makes it unique among Sclerorhynchids. Rostral teeth appear to vary in morphology according to position and ontogenetic stage. Unlike the related Onchopristis and Atlanticopristis, it lives in a marine rather than fluvial environment and likely preferred cooler waters.

References

Sclerorhynchidae
Prehistoric cartilaginous fish genera